The M.O. Campbell Educational Center is an indoor arena in Houston, Texas. The facility serves as the home basketball and volleyball court for the five high schools in the Aldine Independent School District (AISD). The Campbell Center is also used for graduations, theatrical performances, meetings, conferences, banquets and community events.

The arena seats 7,000 people and is located on Aldine-Bender Road just south of Beltway 8, a short distance from George Bush Intercontinental Airport and Greenspoint Mall. It is named for  M.O. Campbell, who served as AISD superintendent from 1973 to 1986 and who is credited with moving the district to a cash-basis operation.

The Campbell Center has hosted many events in its history, including the men's and women's Southland Conference collegiate basketball tournament, the Houston vs. the Nation high school basketball tournament (formerly the Academy National Invitational), the Texas Class 4A and 5A Region III high school basketball playoffs, the Class 5A high school Region III volleyball playoffs, and the University Interscholastic League state powerlifting tournament.

References

Basketball venues in Houston
Indoor arenas in Texas
Volleyball venues in Houston
High school sports in Texas
1996 establishments in Texas
Sports venues completed in 1996